1881 Düzce Belediye is a Turkish basketball club based in Düzce. It plays in the Turkish Basketball First League, the national second division. The Kalıcı Konutlar Merkez Spor Salonu, which has a capacity of 2,500 people, is the home arena of the club.

References

External links
Website

Basketball teams in Turkey
Basketball teams established in 1986
Düzce